Orlando Maini (born 17 December 1958 in Bologna) is an Italian former professional cyclist, who rode in 11 Grand Tours. He currently works as a directeur sportif for UCI Continental team .

Major results
1984
1st Stage 9 Vuelta a España
1985
1st Stage 7 Giro d'Italia

References

External links

1958 births
Living people
Italian male cyclists
Italian Vuelta a España stage winners
Italian Giro d'Italia stage winners
Cyclists from Bologna